Anderson França Varejão (born September 28, 1982) is a Brazilian former professional basketball player who played 14 seasons in the National Basketball Association (NBA), 13 of those with the Cleveland Cavaliers. With a career that spanned four decades and four professional leagues, he also played for Franca and the Flamengo of the Novo Basquete Brasil (NBB), Barcelona of the EuroLeague and Liga ACB, and has been a regular member of the Brazilian national team, winning a gold medal in 2003 at the Pan American Games.

Professional career

Franca (1998–2002)
From 1998 to 2002, Varejão played for Franca Basquetebol Clube in the city of Franca, São Paulo. After averaging 17.7 points, 9.7 rebounds and 3 blocks per game in the first half of the 2001–02 season with them, he signed with FC Barcelona Bàsquet of the Liga ACB in January 2002.

Barcelona (2002–2004)
In nine EuroLeague games, he averaged 4.7 points, 4.0 rebounds, 2.0 assists and 1.1 blocks per game. In two regular season Liga ACB games, he averaged 4.0 points, 5.5 rebounds, 1.0 assists and 1.0 steals per game.

In 2002–03, Varejão appeared in four regular season Liga ACB games for Barcelona, averaging 8.2 points and 6.0 rebounds per game. While Varejão did not play in the 2003 Liga ACB playoffs, Barcelona, led by Juan Carlos Navarro, Šarūnas Jasikevičius and Dejan Bodiroga, won the Liga ACB championship. Varejão also played in 22 EuroLeague games (starting in one), helping Barcelona to their first ever EuroLeague championship. He averaged 4.1 points and 3.2 rebounds per game. He later scored one point in the EuroLeague championship game against Benetton Treviso.

In 2003–04, Varejão appeared in 27 regular season Liga ACB games for Barcelona, averaging 7.5 points and 4.4 rebounds per game. Varejão once again did not play in the playoffs, but Barcelona, led by Navarro and Bodiroga, won its second straight Liga ACB championship. Varejão also played in 18 EuroLeague games, averaging 7.7 points and 5.0 rebounds per game.

Cleveland Cavaliers (2004–2016)

2004–06: Early years
Varejão was selected by the Orlando Magic in the second round of the 2004 NBA draft, 30th overall. On July 23, 2004, the Magic traded Varejão, along with Drew Gooden and Steven Hunter, to the Cleveland Cavaliers in exchange for Tony Battie and two future second-round picks.

In his rookie season, Varejão played in 54 games and averaged 4.9 points and 4.8 rebounds in 16 minutes played per game. He had a season high 14 points on March 26, 2005 against the Dallas Mavericks and a season high 14 rebounds on January 15, 2005 against the Utah Jazz. He ranked first in the NBA in steals per turnover (1.58), fourth in the NBA in offensive rebounds per 48 minutes (6.1), second among rookies in offensive rebounds per 48 minutes (6.1), and fourth in total rebounds per 48 minutes (14.3).

After missing the first 32 games of the 2005–06 season with a dislocated right shoulder, Varejão played in 48 games, starting four and averaging 4.8 points and 4.6 rebounds in under 16 minutes per game. Varejão had a season high 14 points on two occasions and a career high 18 rebounds on April 19, 2006 against the Atlanta Hawks.

On February 21, 2006, fans at Quicken Loans Arena attempted to break the Guinness World Record for "most people wearing wigs in a single venue" when 20,562 fans wore wigs given away before the game in celebration of Varejão's unique hairstyle. All fans in attendance were instructed to put the wigs on during a timeout. It does not appear, however, that the fans were successful, as the Philadelphia Flyers now claim to have the wig wearing record with 9,315.

As a major contributor during the Cavaliers' 2006 playoff run, Varejão averaged 6.8 points and 4.5 rebounds (equating to 13.3 points and 8.8 rebounds per 36 minutes played). During the Eastern Conference Semifinal series against the Detroit Pistons, the career 63% foul shooter uncharacteristically shot over 80% from the free throw line and played a big part in the Cavaliers' wins in Game 3 (16 points) and Game 4 (drawing a charge from Chauncey Billups with 29 seconds left to play and by preventing Richard Hamilton from making a potentially game-winning shot).

2006–08: Playoff upsets

In the 2006–07 season, Varejão received increased minutes from head coach Mike Brown. In 81 games played (six starts), he averaged 6.8 points and 6.7 rebounds per game and was a staple on defense, taking 99 charges in the season, which was the most in the NBA. Varejão also tied with Al Harrington for eighth in the NBA in personal fouls (269) and was eighth in the NBA's Defensive Rating.

Varejão had a career high 17 points on December 11, 2006 against the New Orleans Hornets and a season high 17 rebounds (including a career high nine offensive rebounds) against the Utah Jazz on February 14.

Varejão played in all 20 of the Cavs' playoff games, averaging 6.0 points and 6.0 rebounds. He had a playoff high 14 points and a career playoff high 14 rebounds in a Game 2 loss to Detroit in the Eastern Conference Finals. Varejão helped the Cavaliers reach the 2007 NBA Finals, but they lost to the San Antonio Spurs in four games.

In the 2007 offseason Varejão became a restricted free agent, and he did not sign a contract with the Cavaliers at the start of the 2007–08 NBA season. On December 4, 2007, he signed a two-year $11.1 million offer sheet (with a player option for a third year at $6.2 million) with the Charlotte Bobcats. Under the NBA's collective bargaining rules, the Cavaliers had one week to match the offer sheet, which the Cavaliers did on December 5.

In 48 regular season games played (13 starts), Varejão averaged career highs in minutes (27.5), rebounds (8.3), offensive rebounds (2.8), and assists (1.1). He had a season high and tied his career high with 17 points on April 2, 2008 against the Charlotte Bobcats, a season high and career high tying 18 rebounds on January 11, 2008 (also against the Bobcats), and a career high six assists on March 8, 2008 against the Indiana Pacers. In his 13 starts, he averaged 7.9 points and 10.1 rebounds.

In 13 playoff games, Varejão averaged 4.1 points, 5.2 rebounds and a career playoff high 0.7 assists. Varejão scored 12 points in a Game Four win against the Boston Celtics and pulled down 10 rebounds in a Game Two loss to the Celtics.

2008–13: All-Defensive honors and injury-plagued season
On November 7, 2008, Varejao scored a then career-high 18 points in a win against the Indiana Pacers. On January 2, 2009, Varejao eclipsed his personal best by scoring a career-high 26 points in a win over the Chicago Bulls. After the 2008–09 NBA season, Varejao reached an agreement with the Cavaliers to sign a six-year contract worth $42.5 million.

During the 2009–10 season, Varejão played in 76 games, but only started in seven. He still averaged 8.6 points per game and 7.6 rebounds per game in 28.5 minutes per game. On December 30, 2009, Varejão made the game-winning 3-pointer against the Atlanta Hawks. The Cavaliers once again made the playoffs in the 2009–10 season where they eventually lost to the Boston Celtics in the Eastern Conference Semifinals. To conclude the season, Varejão was also named to the NBA All-Defensive Second Team.

Varejão became the Cavaliers' starting center. He averaged 9.1 points per game and 9.7 rebounds in 32 minutes per game, but after playing in all 31 games was forced to miss the rest of the season because of a torn tendon in his right ankle suffered on January 6.

Once again, Varejão was Cleveland's starting center, but this time he suffered a broken right wrist on February 10, causing him to miss the rest of the season. In 25 games played, Varejao averaged 10.8 points and 11.5 rebounds in 31 minutes per game. He set his then career high with 20 rebounds on January 31, 2012; he also added 20 points in the game.
In the 2012–13 Cavaliers season opener, a home victory over the Washington Wizards on October 30, 2012, Varejão nearly acquired a triple-double, tallying nine points, a career high nine assists, and a then-career high 23 rebounds.

On January 21, 2013, it was announced that Varejão would miss the remainder of the season after being hospitalized for a blood clot in his lung. Over 25 games, he per-game averages were 14.1 points, 14.4 rebounds, 3.4 assists, and 1.5 steals; all career highs.

2013–16: Final years in Cleveland
In 2013–14, Varejão started just 29 games for the Cavaliers as the team had Andrew Bynum in the first half of the season and Spencer Hawes in the second. After starting early on, Varejão lost his spot in mid-November to Bynum before reclaiming it in late December after Bynum was suspended indefinitely by the team. Bynum was traded in January and the Cavaliers acquired Hawes in February. It was around this time that Varejão was sidelined for a month with back soreness, and upon his return in March, he came off the bench for the rest of the season. Varejão played in 65 games, finishing the season averaging 8.4 points, 9.7 rebounds, 2.2 assists, and 1.1 steals in 28 minutes per game.

On October 31, 2014, Varejão signed a three-year, $30 million contract extension with the Cavaliers. He had been having a good offensive season as LeBron James' favorite pick-and-roll partner, shooting 55 percent from the field and averaging 10 points and 6.6 rebounds. On December 23, 2014, against the Minnesota Timberwolves, Varejão tore his Achilles and was subsequently ruled out for the rest of the season. The Cavaliers reached the 2015 NBA Finals, where they lost to the Golden State Warriors in six games.

Varejão made his return from injury in the Cavaliers' season-opening loss to the Chicago Bulls on October 27, 2015.

On February 18, 2016, Varejão was traded, along with a future first-round draft pick, to the Portland Trail Blazers in exchange for a future second-round pick. He was waived by Portland immediately upon being acquired.

Golden State Warriors (2016–2017)
On February 22, 2016, Varejão signed with the Golden State Warriors. He made his debut for the Warriors two days later and averaged 2.6 points and 2.3 rebounds in 8.5 minutes per game to finish the regular season. The 2015–16 Warriors won an NBA-record 73 games to eclipse the 72 wins set by the 1995–96 Chicago Bulls. They reached the 2016 NBA Finals after overcoming a 3–1 deficit in the Western Conference Finals against the Oklahoma City Thunder to win the series in seven games. In the NBA Finals, they faced Varejão's former team, the Cleveland Cavaliers. According to the Elias Sports Bureau, Varejão became the first player in NBA history to play for both Finals teams in the same season. The Warriors lost the NBA Finals in seven games despite being up 3–1. Cleveland offered Varejão a championship ring, but he declined as he played for the opposition.

On July 17, 2016, Varejão re-signed with the Warriors. He was waived on February 3, 2017, after averaging 1.3 points and 1.9 rebounds in 6.6 minutes over 14 games, with one start. The Warriors went on to win the NBA championship in 2017, and as a result, Varejão was offered a championship ring, which he accepted.

Flamengo (2018–2019)
On January 17, 2018, Varejão signed a 20-month contract with Flamengo. He played the second half of the 2017–18 season and then continued on with Flamengo for the 2018–19 season.

Return to Cleveland (2021)

On May 4, 2021, Varejão signed a 10-day contract with the Cleveland Cavaliers. The team was granted a hardship exception to acquire Varejão. Ten days later, he signed a second 10-day contract.

Varejão announced his retirement following the 2020–21 season.

National team career
Varejão has been a regular member of the senior Brazilian national team since 2001, winning a gold medal in 2003 at the Pan American Games and competing in every world cup between 2002 and 2019. On August 23, 2006, Varejão committed a controversial foul during a preliminary game of the 2006 FIBA World Championship against Greece, elbowing Greek point guard Nikos Zisis in the face.

Player profile
Varejão earned the nickname "Wild Thing" because of his wild hair and energetic and relentless style of play. He has been criticized for flopping when trying to draw a charge: Ian Thomsen, a Sports Illustrated columnist, grouped him with fellow foreign players Vlade Divac and Manu Ginóbili as the players who "made [flopping] famous", exaggerating contact on the court the way players dive in association football games. Long-time Cavaliers teammate LeBron James defended him, stating "He's taking physical charges."

Personal life
Varejão has an older brother, Sandro, who also was a professional basketball player. His niece, Izabel, plays college basketball for the University of Michigan.

NBA career statistics

Regular season

|-
| style="text-align:left;"|
| style="text-align:left;"|Cleveland
| 54 || 0 || 16.0 || .513 || .000 || .535 || 4.8 || .5 || .8 || .7 || 4.9
|-
| style="text-align:left;"|
| style="text-align:left;"|Cleveland
| 48 || 4 || 15.8 || .527 || .000 || .513 || 4.9 || .4 || .6 || .4 || 4.6
|-
| style="text-align:left;"|
| style="text-align:left;"|Cleveland
| 81 || 6 || 23.9 || .476 || .000 || .616 || 6.7 || .9 || .9 || .6 || 6.8
|-
| style="text-align:left;"|
| style="text-align:left;"|Cleveland
| 48 || 13 || 27.5 || .461 || .000 || .598 || 8.3 || 1.1 || .8 || .5 || 6.7
|-
| style="text-align:left;"|
| style="text-align:left;"|Cleveland
| 81 || 42 || 28.5 || .536 || .000 || .616 || 7.2 || 1.0 || .9 || .8 || 8.6
|-
| style="text-align:left;"|
| style="text-align:left;"|Cleveland
| 76 || 7 || 28.5 || .572 || .200 || .663 || 7.6 || 1.1 || .9 || .9 || 8.6
|-
| style="text-align:left;"|
| style="text-align:left;"|Cleveland
| 31 || 31 || 32.1 || .528 || .000 || .667 || 9.7 || 1.5 || .9 || 1.2 || 9.1
|-
| style="text-align:left;"|
| style="text-align:left;"|Cleveland
| 25 || 25 || 31.4 || .514 || .000 || .672 || 11.5 || 1.7 || 1.4 || .7 || 10.8
|-
| style="text-align:left;"|
| style="text-align:left;"|Cleveland
| 25 || 25 || 36.0 || .478 || .000 || .755 || 14.4 || 3.4 || 1.5 || .6 || 14.1
|-
| style="text-align:left;"|
| style="text-align:left;"|Cleveland
| 65 || 29 || 27.7 || .495 || .000 || .681 || 9.7 || 2.2 || 1.1 || .6 || 8.4
|-
| style="text-align:left;"|
| style="text-align:left;"|Cleveland
| 26 || 26 || 24.5 || .555 || .000 || .733 || 6.5 || 1.3 || 1.1 || .6 || 9.8
|-
| style="text-align:left;"|
| style="text-align:left;"|Cleveland
| 31 || 0 || 10.0 || .421 || .000 || .762 || 2.9 || .6 || .4 || .2 || 2.6
|-
| style="text-align:left;"|
| style="text-align:left;"|Golden State
| 22 || 0 || 8.5 || .438 ||  || .552 || 2.3 || .7 || .2 || .2 || 2.6
|-
| style="text-align:left;"|
| style="text-align:left;"|Golden State
| 14 || 1 || 6.6 || .357 ||  || .727 || 1.9 || .7 || .2 || .2 || 1.3
|-
| style="text-align:left;"|
| style="text-align:left;"|Cleveland
| 5 || 0 || 7.2 || .250 || .000 || .556 || 4.0 || .6 || 0 || .4 || 2.6
|- class="sortbottom"
| style="text-align:center;" colspan="2"|Career
| 632 || 209 || 23.9 || .509 || .023 || .630 || 7.2 || 1.2 || .8 || .6 || 7.2

Playoffs

|-
| style="text-align:left;"|2006
| style="text-align:left;"|Cleveland
| 13 || 0 || 18.3 || .620 ||  || .703 || 4.5 || .2 || .7 || .2 || 6.8
|-
| style="text-align:left;"|2007
| style="text-align:left;"|Cleveland
| 20 || 0 || 22.4 || .511 || .000 || .563 || 6.0 || .6 || 1.0 || .6 || 6.0
|-
| style="text-align:left;"|2008
| style="text-align:left;"|Cleveland
| 13 || 0 || 18.5 || .407 ||  || .429 || 5.2 || .7 || .6 || .1 || 4.1
|-
| style="text-align:left;"|2009
| style="text-align:left;"|Cleveland
| 14 || 14 || 30.0 || .500 ||  || .682 || 6.4 || .6 || 1.3 || 1.1 || 6.9
|-
| style="text-align:left;"|2010
| style="text-align:left;"|Cleveland
| 11 || 0 || 23.2 || .417 || .000 || .742 || 6.5 || .6 || 1.0 || .8 || 5.7
|-
| style="text-align:left;"|2016
| style="text-align:left;"|Golden State
| 17 || 0 || 5.5 || .357 ||  || .526 || 1.2 || .8 || .1 || .1 || 1.2
|- class="sortbottom"
| style="text-align:center;" colspan="2"|Career
| 88 || 14 || 19.2 || .488 || .000 || .618 || 4.8 || .6 || .5 || .8 || 5.0

References

External links

 Anderson Varejão at archive.fiba.com
 Anderson Varejão at euroleague.net
 Anderson Varejão at interbasket.net
 Anderson Varejão at lnb.com.br 

1982 births
Living people
2002 FIBA World Championship players
2006 FIBA World Championship players
2010 FIBA World Championship players
2014 FIBA Basketball World Cup players
2019 FIBA Basketball World Cup players
Basketball players at the 2003 Pan American Games
Basketball players at the 2012 Summer Olympics
Brazilian expatriate basketball people in Spain
Brazilian expatriate basketball people in the United States
Brazilian men's basketball players
Centers (basketball)
Cleveland Cavaliers players
FC Barcelona Bàsquet players
Flamengo basketball players
Franca Basquetebol Clube players
Golden State Warriors players
Liga ACB players
Medalists at the 2003 Pan American Games
Novo Basquete Brasil players
National Basketball Association players from Brazil
Olympic basketball players of Brazil
Orlando Magic draft picks
Pan American Games gold medalists for Brazil
Pan American Games medalists in basketball
Sportspeople from Espírito Santo
Power forwards (basketball)